Borrowdale is a valley in the English Lake District. It is located in the old county of Westmorland, and is sometimes referred to as Westmorland Borrowdale in order to distinguish it from a more famous Borrowdale located in the traditional county of Cumberland.

The valley straddles the eastern border of the Lake District National Park, and is part of Cumbria.

The upper segment, above High Borrow Bridge, is very remote; the lower segment carries a bridleway along its length, and has easy parking at the eastern end just off the A685, but remains quiet even in the high season.

References

Valleys of Cumbria
Westmorland
Tebay